Men's Football at the 1991 South Asian Games was held in Colombo, Sri Lanka from December 22 to 29, 1991.

Fixtures and results
Accurate as of 29 December 1991.

Group stage

Group A

Group B

Bronze medal match

Gold medal match

Winner

References

External links
 RSSSF - 5th South Asian Federation Games 1991 (Colombo, Sri Lanka)

1991 South Asian Games
1991 South Asian Games